

2023 DW is a near-Earth asteroid of the Aten group. On 28 February 2023, with an observation arc of 1.2 days, it was rated 1 on the Torino scale for a virtual impactor on 14 February 2046 at 21:36 UTC. The nominal approach is expected to occur about eight hours before the impact scenario at 14 February 2046 13:15 ± 72 minutes. Between 5–8 March, the asteroid was not observed as it was within 40 degrees of the waxing gibbous moon. On 14 March 2023 the European Space Agency was the first to drop to a Torino scale rating of 0. Sentry dropped to a Torino scale rating of 0 on 16 March 2023. It was removed from the risk table on 20 March 2023.

2023 DW currently orbits the Sun once every 271 days. It came to perihelion (closest approach to the Sun) on 26 November 2022, and then approached Earth from the direction of the Sun making closest Earth approach on 18 February 2023 at distance of about 8.7 million km.

Risk
With an observation arc of 13 days it peaked at a Palermo scale rating of –1.89 with the odds of impact then being about 78 times less than the background hazard level.

Risk corridor 
Risk corridor as it was known on 3 March 2023 with a 4-day observation arc and 55 observations. The asteroid would have most likely impacted the Pacific Ocean. As the uncertainty region gets smaller the probability of impact can increase and then suddenly drop to 0.

Notes

References

External links 
 
 
 
 LOV (uncertainty region): 5000 clones calculated in SOLEX 12.1. Based on 60 observations through March 4 / 5000 clones, SOLEX 12.1, 69 observations through March 11 / 5000 clones, SOLEX 12.1, 104 obervations through March 15 (ptastro1)
 Risk Corridor Calculations: Piero_Sicoli and StevearenoBR
 Discovery circumstances: Alain Maury's blog

Minor planet object articles (unnumbered)
Potential impact events caused by near-Earth objects
20230218
20230226